Geisenfeld is a town in the district of Pfaffenhofen, in Bavaria, Germany. The town grew up around Geisenfeld Abbey, a convent founded in 1037.

Subdivisions

Geisenfeld has twelve districts, formerly independent municipalities:
Engelbrechtsmünster
Gaden including Wasenstadt and Furthof
Geisenfeld
Geisenfeldwinden
Ilmendorf including Einberg
Nötting
Parleiten including Eichelberg, Holzleiten and Scheuerhof
Rottenegg including Hornlohe, Moosmühle and Brunn
Schillwitzried including Schillwitzhausen, Schafhof and Gießübel
Untermettenbach including Obermettenbach and Ziegelstadel
Unterpindhart including Kolmhof, Untereulenthal and Obereulenthal
Zell including Ainau, Ritterswörth, Unterzell and Oberzell

Sons and daughters of the town

 Gregor Strasser (1892-1934), national socialist politician, publisher and participant in Hitler-Ludendorff-Putsch

References

Pfaffenhofen (district)